Bohumil Jank (born 6 July 1992) is a Czech professional ice hockey defenceman playing for Mountfield HK of the Czech Extraliga.

Jank has previously played for HC České Budějovice, HC Oceláři Třinec, Piráti Chomutov and HC Plzeň. He has also played in the Kontinental Hockey League for HC Lev Poprad.

Career statistics

References

External links

1992 births
Living people
Motor České Budějovice players
Czech ice hockey defencemen
BK Havlíčkův Brod players
Stadion Hradec Králové players
HC Lev Poprad players
BK Mladá Boleslav players
HC Oceláři Třinec players
People from Milevsko
Piráti Chomutov players
IHC Písek players
HC Plzeň players
HC Stadion Litoměřice players
HC Tábor players
Victoriaville Tigres players
Sportspeople from the South Bohemian Region
Czech expatriate ice hockey players in Canada
Czech expatriate ice hockey players in Slovakia